Johann (Hans) Ladenspelder (born Essen, 1512 - died after 1574) (aka Hans of Essen) was a German printmaker and engraver. He is particularly known for engraving a copy of a complete set (E series) of Mantegna Tarocchi cards, one of the earliest complete sets still extant.

References

1512 births
Year of death unknown